Huddersfield Town's 1949–50 campaign saw Town finish in their highest position in Division 1 since their 3rd-place finish in the 1935–36 season. They finished in 15th place with just 37 points and most of the highlights of the season were of the negative sort with disappointing thrashings by Wolverhampton Wanderers and Manchester United, as well as a 6–0 drubbing by Sunderland in the FA Cup.

Squad at the start of the season

Review
After Arnold Rodgers' goal in the final match of the previous season, some were wondering how Town would cope in Division 1 as they headed into the 1950s. The season didn't start too well with Town only winning 1 of their first 10 matches, that being a 2–1 win over Charlton Athletic, but that run also included a 7–1 defeat by Wolverhampton Wanderers.

Town's form would never dramatically improve, which led Town to another relegation battle, but an improvement saw Town finish in the more respectable position of 15th place. This was also the season that Town played 2 matches at Elland Road, the home of rivals Leeds United, because of a fire at Leeds Road after the game against Manchester United.

Squad at the end of the season

Results

Division One

FA Cup

Appearances and goals

1949-50
English football clubs 1949–50 season